Ikedidae is a family of spoon worms in the suborder Bonelliida. It is a monotypic family, the only genus being Ikeda. These worms burrow into soft sediment on the seabed.

Examination of the original material of Ikeda taenoides by Teruaki Nishikawa in 2002 showed that the longitudinal muscle layer lay between the circular layer and the oblique layer, as in all other echiurans, throwing the validity of the family Ikedidae into doubt. Nishikawa advocates that the family be regarded as a junior synonym of Echiuridae.

Species
The World Register of Marine Species recognises the following species in the genus:-

Ikeda pirotansis (Menon & DattaGupta, 1962)
Ikeda taenioides (Ikeda, 1904)

References

Echiurans
Monogeneric protostome families